The 1950 Tasmanian state election was held on 6 May 1950 in the Australian state of Tasmania to elect 30 members of the Tasmanian House of Assembly. The election used the Hare-Clark proportional representation system — six members were elected from each of five electorates.

Following the 1948 election, Premier  Robert Cosgrove and the Labor Party remained in government with the support of independent MHA Bill Wedd. At the 1950 election, Cosgrove was seeking another term in office against the opposition Liberal Party, which had replaced Neil Campbell with Rex Townley as leader in February 1950.

At the election, Labor retained 15 seats in the House of Assembly, and the Liberals regained one seat previously held by an independent, whilst Rex Townley, formerly an Independent Liberal, retained his seat as a Liberal.

Results

|}

 Rex Townley joined the Liberal Party before the election, and had a personal vote of 3.88% in 1948 (19.97% of the Denison vote), so the actual net difference in votes between 1948 and 1950 was 5.85%.

Distribution of votes

Primary vote by division

Distribution of seats

See also
 Members of the Tasmanian House of Assembly, 1950–1955
 Candidates of the 1950 Tasmanian state election

References

External links
Assembly Election Results, 1950, Parliament of Tasmania.
Report on General Election, 1950, Tasmanian Electoral Commission.

Elections in Tasmania
1950 elections in Australia
1950s in Tasmania
May 1950 events in Australia